Brusson (Issime ; Gressoney )  is a town and comune in Val d'Ayas, a left minor valley of the Aosta Valley region in Italy.

It is well known as a summer and winter vacationing spot, and better known for its plentiful cross-country skiing trails. It is also a good starting point for climbing Monte Rosa. Brusson is part of the Monterosa Ski domain, home to cross-country skiing trails used for several World Cup races. On the road that leads to the panoramic Col di Joux, which connects Val d'Ayas with Saint-Vincent, there is the fountain where Napoleon is said to have quenched his thirst in 1800. The Chamousira Fenilliaz mine, the most important gold mine in the Aosta Valley discovered in 1899, is also located within the municipality and was active from 1900 until the end of the 1980s.

Sights include the medieval Graines Castle.

Brusson is a good starting point for reaching the Palasinaz Lakes ("Laghi di Palasinaz" in Italian), a group of lakes located in the Valle d'Aosta region.

Twin towns
 Forio, Italy (2008)

References

External links